Walter Charles Stevens (26 September 1904 – 24 October 1954) was a British trade unionist.

Born in Woolwich, Stevens began working at the age of ten, and completed an apprenticeship as an electrician by the age of twenty.  He soon became a sound engineer at Denham Studios, and was also active in the Electrical Trades Union (ETU).

Stevens became a full-time employee of the ETU in his thirties, serving for a while as the union's London Area Secretary, and in 1942 he was elected as Assistant General Secretary.  Around 1946, he joined the Communist Party of Great Britain and, in 1948, he became General Secretary of the ETU.  He won a landslide victory, with more than three times the votes of his opponent.

In office, Stevens moved the union in a more militant direction, organising a wave of strikes in late 1953 and early 1954.

In his spare time, Stevens enjoyed attending boxing matches, and he was involved in founding the Professional Boxers' Association.  He stood in the 1952 and 1953 elections for the General Council of the Trades Union Congress, but was unsuccessful.

Stevens was seriously injured in a car accident in October 1954, and died a week later, aged 50.

References

1904 births
1954 deaths
Communist Party of Great Britain members
General Secretaries of the Electrical Trades Union (United Kingdom)
People from Woolwich
Road incident deaths in England